Ceccato is a surname. Notable people with the surname include:

Aldo Ceccato (born 1934), Italian conductor
Andrea Ceccato (born 1985), Italian rugby union player
Enrico Ceccato (born 1986), Italian rugby union player 
Giuseppe Ceccato (born 1950), Venetist politician
Silvio Ceccato (1914–1997), Italian philosopher and linguist